This was the second season of the new Russian Professional Rugby League,

Final league table

Play-offs

2006
2006 in Russian rugby union
2006 rugby union tournaments for clubs
2005–06 in European rugby union leagues
2006–07 in European rugby union leagues